Nellie Spindler (September 1891 – 21 August 1917) was a staff nurse who was killed during the Battle of Passchendaele. She is one of only two British female casualties of World War I buried in Belgium and the only woman buried among more than 10,000 men at Lijssenthoek Military Cemetery.

Life
Nellie Spindler was born to Elizabeth and George Kealey Spindler in Wakefield, Yorkshire. Her father was a police sergeant, and later inspector, in Wakefield City Police.

Spindler entered nursing in 1911 at the City Fever Hospital, Wakefield and trained at Leeds Township Infirmary from 1912 to 1915. She joined the Queen Alexandra's Imperial Military Nursing Service (QAIMNS) in October 1915. To join the Queen Alexandra's Imperial Military Nursing Service it was necessary to be single or recently widowed, to have completed a three-year training course in a hospital approved by the War Office and to be over 25 years old; Spindler was only 24 at the time she signed up. On her application form, she said her year of birth was 1889 rather than 1891. It is possible that this was a mistake, but she may have concealed her true age so she would appear to be old enough to serve.

Career
After being accepted into the QAIMNS, from 10 November 1915 until 24 April 1917 she worked at Whittington Military Hospital, Lichfield. While there she was declared fit for service overseas. In May 1917, she travelled to France and worked in No. 2 General Hospital at Le Havre in the Somme before being transferred to No. 44 Casualty Clearing Station (CCS) which moved to Brandhoek, Belgium, in July 1917. This CCS specialised in abdominal, chest and thigh wounds which needed urgent treatment and so was stationed relatively close to the front line. Though about seven miles from the frontlines, Brandhoek was within range of the larger German guns, and with its railway sidings and munitions dumps was the target of frequent German shelling.

On 21 August 1917, the CCS was bombarded and at 11.00am Spindler was hit  by an exploding shell along with four other nurses who were concussed. She died 20 minutes later in the arms of Sister Minnie Wood, the sister-in-charge. In a letter home, Sister Kate Luard recalled:

The British Journal of Nursing on 8 September 1917 stated:

Patients and personnel were evacuated from  Brandhoek to Remy Siding at Lijssenthoek, south of Poperinge. Spindler's body was then taken to Lijssenthoek Military Cemetery. Her death was registered as having been killed in action on a casualty form for officers. She was given a full military funeral  the next day. The "Last Post" was sounded and in attendance were General Hubert Gough, C.O. of Fifth Army, three other generals, the Director of Medical Services of the Army, the Surgeon General and over 100 other officers. The condolence card on General Gough's wreath read 'with deepest respect' and was sent to her mother on 3 September.

Her gravestone bears the inscription "A noble type of good heroic womanhood".

Recognition
In 2018 a half-mile long new road linking to Wakefield's new Eastern Relief Road in Stanley was named Nellie Spindler Drive following a public vote.

Notes

References

1891 births
1917 deaths
British women nurses
British women in World War I
English nurses
Female nurses in World War I
Female wartime nurses
Nurses killed in World War I
People from Wakefield
Queen Alexandra's Royal Army Nursing Corps officers
British Army personnel of World War I
British military personnel killed in World War I
Burials at Lijssenthoek Military Cemetery